Fiene is a surname. Notable people with the surname include:

Ernest Fiene (1894–1965), American graphic artist
Lou Fiene (1884–1964), American baseball player

See also
Fieve
Fine (surname)
Liene